The Insular Region of Equatorial Guinea comprises the former Spanish territory of Fernando Po, together with Annobón island, the latter formerly part of the Spanish territory of Elobey, Annobón, and Corisco, which was located in the Gulf of Guinea and in the Corisco Bay.

The region covers 2,052 km2 and has a population of 340,362 in 2015. It is split into three political jurisdictions:
Annobón
Bioko Norte
Bioko Sur
The islands located in Corisco Bay are not part of the Insular Region but are included in the Litoral Province which is part of the Continental Region (Litoral Province).

The largest city, Malabo, is the national and regional administrative capital. The other main cities are Luba, Riaba, Rebola, Baney, and San Antonio de Palé.

Bioko was known as "Fernando Po" until the 1970s. It is located about 40 km away from Cameroon and is the largest island of the Gulf of Guinea, covering 2,017 km2.

Annobón is a small 17 km2 volcanic island, and the most remote territory of the Republic of Equatorial Guinea. It is located 670 km away from Malabo, and 580 km away from Bata, just south of the equator. The sovereign state of São Tomé and Príncipe, is located between Annobón and Bioko.

References
Equatorial Guinea Government

Regions of Equatorial Guinea

Former Spanish colonies
Geography of Equatorial Guinea